Valery Belousov (born 4 March 1940) is a Russian boxer. He competed in the men's lightweight event at the 1968 Summer Olympics.

References

1940 births
Living people
Russian male boxers
Olympic boxers of the Soviet Union
Boxers at the 1968 Summer Olympics
Martial artists from Moscow
Lightweight boxers